= Working Cats Program =

Animal rehoming and rodent management program in Los Angeles

The Working Cats Program in Los Angeles, California, created by animal activist Melya Kaplan in 1999, is a green program that relocates sterilized and vaccinated feral cats to residences or businesses with large rat populations.

The program provides a useful role in society for feral cats, who would otherwise be euthanized in shelters. It is humane for both cats and rats, who through traditional extermination methods, die painful deaths through poisoning and glue traps. Instead, the rats are simply repelled by the cats' odor, and leave the site.

The program was first implemented in 1999, at the Flower Mart in downtown Los Angeles. The area was plagued by rats, and the extermination methods (spraying poison) was not only making the humans sick, it did not solve the rat problem. Melya Kaplan, Executive Director of Voice For The Animals Foundation, brought in sterilized feral cats, and the rat situation was brought under control. The Los Angeles Police Department is another benefactor of the Working Cats Program. When some of the police stations were overrun with rats, Kaplan stepped in to suggest using the program. "We get cats from the shelter deemed feral (unsocialized), [who are] going to be euthanized because they're not adoptable," says Melya. "We put them on site, where they're going to live for the rest of their lives." The process begins with taking healthy feral cats from shelters and getting them neutered, microchipped, and vaccinated. The cats are then brought to the new environment, and kept in a large holding cages for a minimum of three weeks where they become accustomed with the sights, smells, and sounds of their new location. This is called grounding the cats (acclimating them to their new homes). Once the cats are acclimated to their new environment, they are released into their territory where they will remain. The cats are given fresh food and water by their new owners, which is mandatory because they do not eat the rats. It is the odor of the cats that drives away rodent populations.

The program has been successfully implemented in the Flower Mart, Crossroads School Campus, The Los Angeles Police Department (Wilshire, Foothill, and Southeast Divisions), the Self Realization Lake Shrine in the Pacific Palisades, and various residences and small businesses. Other animal advocacy organizations around the country are now beginning to use this program.
